The following lists events that happened in 1925 in Iceland.

Incumbents
Monarch - Kristján X
Prime Minister – Jón Magnússon

Events
1925 Úrvalsdeild

Births

26 May – Ragnar Sigtryggsson, footballer (d. 2009)
6 July – Eggert Gíslason Þorsteinsson, politician (d. 1995)
19 July – Óskar Jónsson, middle-distance runner, Olympian.
12 August – Thor Vilhjálmsson, writer (d. 2011)
8 September – Jóhann Berg Guðmundsson, composer, pianist and conductor (d. 2005)
16 December – Geir Hallgrímsson, politician (d. 1990)

Full date missing
Einar Pálsson, writer (d. 1996)

Deaths

Full date missing
Helgi Jónsson, botanist and phycologist (b. 1867)

References

 
1920s in Iceland
Iceland
Iceland
Years of the 20th century in Iceland